The 1976-77 NBA season was the Bulls' 11th season in the NBA.

Offseason

Draft picks

Roster

Regular season

Season standings

z – clinched division title
y – clinched division title
x – clinched playoff spot

Record vs. opponents

Playoffs

|- align="center" bgcolor="#ffcccc"
| 1
| April 12
| @ Portland
| L 83–96
| Mickey Johnson (19)
| Artis Gilmore (14)
| Norm Van Lier (8)
| Memorial Coliseum12,774
| 0–1
|- align="center" bgcolor="#ccffcc"
| 2
| April 15
| Portland
| W 107–104
| Mickey Johnson (29)
| Mickey Johnson (15)
| Norm Van Lier (11)
| Chicago Stadium20,000
| 1–1
|- align="center" bgcolor="#ffcccc"
| 3
| April 17
| @ Portland
| L 98–106
| Mickey Johnson (14)
| Johnson, Gilmore (14)
| Norm Van Lier (10)
| Memorial Coliseum12,520
| 1–2
|-

Awards and records
Norm Van Lier, NBA All-Defensive First Team
Scott May, NBA All-Rookie Team 1st Team
Norm Van Lier, NBA All-Star Game

References

Chicago Bulls seasons
Chicago
Chicago Bulls
Chicago Bulls